Purdy is an unincorporated community located near State Highway 76 in Garvin County, Oklahoma, United States.

References

Unincorporated communities in Garvin County, Oklahoma
Unincorporated communities in Oklahoma